Lomatium bicolor (Wasatch desertparsley) is an herb of the family Apiaceae that occurs in two varieties, Lomatium bicolor var. leptocarpum and Lomatium bicolor var. bicolor.

It is 20–50 cm tall and the stems are split at the ground. Lomatium bicolor has glabrous, or mildly scabrous, compound umbels with yellow flowers that have relatively wide petals. The petioles are 9–14 cm long.

References

External links
 USDA Plants Profile for Lomatium bicolor var. bicolor
 USDA Plants Profile for Lomatium bicolor var. leptocarpum
 United States Forest Service

External links
 USDA Plants Profile for Lomatium bicolor (Wasatch desertparsley)

bicolor
Flora of the Western United States
Flora of the Great Basin
Flora of California
Endemic flora of the United States
Taxa named by John Merle Coulter
Taxa named by Sereno Watson
Flora without expected TNC conservation status